Eiji Uehiro (6 June 1937 – 11 January 2019) was a Japanese ethicist and writer who established the Uehiro Foundation on Ethics and Education in 1987, which later became a partner of the Carnegie Council for Ethics in International Affairs. The foundation was inspired by his father, Tetsuhiko Uehiro, a survivor of the atomic bombing of Hiroshima, whose experiences led him to forming a traditional ethics organization in Japan, which Uehiro considered not to have a universal or international enough focus. In 2002, he established the Uehiro Chair in Practical Ethics at the University of Oxford; a year later, this led to the formation of the Oxford Uehiro Centre for Practical Ethics.

Uehiro received the Medal with Blue Ribbon from the Emperor of Japan in 1997, for his services to ethical education.  In 2016, he received the Order of the Rising Sun, 3rd class.

English publications

References 

1937 births
2019 deaths
20th-century Japanese male writers
Japanese ethicists
Organization founders
People from Kumamoto
Recipients of the Medal with Blue Ribbon
Recipients of the Order of the Rising Sun, 3rd class